Echinophryne is a small genus of frogfishes.

Species
There are currently three recognized species in this genus:
 Echinophryne crassispina McCulloch & Waite, 1918 (Prickly anglerfish)
 Echinophryne mitchellii Morton, 1897 (Long-spined anglerfish)
 Echinophryne reynoldsi Pietsch & Kuiter, 1984 (Sponge anglerfish)

References

Antennariidae
Taxa named by Allan Riverstone McCulloch
Taxa named by Edgar Ravenswood Waite
Marine fish genera